The men's triple jump was one of six jumping events on the Athletics at the 1908 Summer Olympics programme in London. The competition was held on 25 July 1908. Twenty athletes from eight nations competed. NOCs could enter up to 12 athletes. The event was won by Tim Ahearne of Great Britain, breaking a streak of three American victories in the triple jump. All three medal-winning nations were on the podium for the first time.

Background

This was the fourth appearance of the event, which is one of 12 athletics events to have been held at every Summer Olympics. No athletes from the 1904 Games returned. The triple jump was still "rarely contested at national meets in this era" and once again there was no favorite in the Olympic event.

Canada, Finland, Norway, and South Africa each made their first appearance in the event. The United States competed for the fourth time, having competed at each of the Games so far.

Competition format

The competition was described as two rounds at the time, but was more similar to the modern divided final. All athletes received three jumps initially. The top three after that received an additional three jumps to improve their distance, but the initial jumps would still count if no improvement was made. The jump format was codified: "The competitor shall first land upon the same foot with which he shall have taken off. The reverse foot shall be used for the second landing, and both feet shall be used for the third landing."

Records

These are the standing world and Olympic records (in metres) prior to the 1908 Summer Olympics.

(*) unofficial

At first Tim Ahearne set a new Olympic record with 14.72 metres. Then Garfield MacDonald improved the record to 14.76 metres and finally Ahearne took the new Olympic record with 14.92 metres.

Schedule

Results

All jumpers performed three jumps. The best three made another three attempts to improve their marks. Best marks are known for the top seventeen jumpers, but no information about marks or placement for the bottom three.

References

Sources
 Official Report of the Games of the IV Olympiad (1908).
 De Wael, Herman. Herman's Full Olympians: "Athletics 1908". Accessed 7 April 2006.

Athletics at the 1908 Summer Olympics
Triple jump at the Olympics